Philip Bretherton (born 30 May 1955) is an English–Swedish actor best known for his role as Alistair Deacon in the long-running British television series As Time Goes By.

Early life
Bretherton was born in Preston, Lancashire, and studied English and drama at the University of Manchester, where he decided to become an actor.

As a young man, Bretherton was in an episode of the BBC TV series Miss Marple: "At Bertram's Hotel", playing Detective Inspector Campbell in 1987.  Another early screen role came in The Balance of Nature (1983).

Career
Bretherton appeared in Rumpole of the Bailey in "The Barrow Boy" in November 1988 and made a brief appearance as "Rod" in Coronation Street also in 1988. He returned as "Robert Weston" in 1991, and again as "Ian Davenport" in 2004.

He was in Casualty as Andrew Bower (Lisa "Duffy" Duffin's husband), Footballer's Wives as Stefan Hauser, New Tricks as Doug Standeven. He also appeared in an episode of The Casebook of Sherlock Holmes, "The Problem of Thor Bridge" in 1990 as Mr. Joyce Cummings Q.C. He has appeared in Series 1 of Murder in Suburbia, as Phillip Whitmore. He further appeared in the episode "Last Seen Wearing" of the television series Inspector Morse in the role of French teacher David Acum. He also appeared in the fifth and final series of Young Dracula as Roquelaire, the vampire high council's head of security and father of Vlad Dracula's bodyguard Talitha. He played Matthew Woodley in Midsomer Murders "Made-to-Measure Murders" in 2010.  Bretherton is probably best known in the role of Alistair Deacon in As Time Goes By from 1992 to 2002 and then 2005 for a reunion special.

Theatre
He is also active in theatre, performing as Henry Higgins in a nationally acclaimed production of Pygmalion at Clwyd Theatr Cymru, Mold, Flintshire.

Filmography
The Balance of Nature (1983)
Cry Freedom (1987)
Dark Floors (2008)
The Fifth Estate (2013)

References

External links
 

1955 births
Living people
English male stage actors
English male television actors
English male film actors
English male voice actors
English male video game actors
Swedish male stage actors
Swedish male television actors
Swedish male film actors
Swedish male voice actors
Swedish male video game actors
Actors from Preston, Lancashire
Alumni of the University of Manchester
Male actors from Lancashire
20th-century English male actors
21st-century English male actors
English expatriates in the United States